The Warren Township Schools are a community public school district that serves students in pre-kindergarten through eighth grade from Warren Township, in Somerset County, New Jersey, United States.

As of the 2020–21 school year, the district, comprised of five schools, had an enrollment of 1,525 students and 188.3 classroom teachers (on an FTE basis), for a student–teacher ratio of 8.1:1.

The district is classified by the New Jersey Department of Education as being in District Factor Group "I", the second-highest of eight groupings. District Factor Groups organize districts statewide to allow comparison by common socioeconomic characteristics of the local districts. From lowest socioeconomic status to highest, the categories are A, B, CD, DE, FG, GH, I and J.

Students in public school for ninth through twelfth grades attend Watchung Hills Regional High School on Stirling Road next to Woodland School. The school also serves students from Warren as well as the neighboring communities of Watchung, Green Brook (in Somerset County), and Long Hill Township (in Morris County). As of the 2020–21 school year, the high school had an enrollment of 1,909 students and 157.6 classroom teachers (on an FTE basis), for a student–teacher ratio of 12.1:1.

Awards and recognition
Woodland School was one of nine public schools recognized in 2017 as Blue Ribbon Schools by the United States Department of Education.

Schools
Schools in the district (with 2020–21 enrollment data from the National Center for Education Statistics.) are:
Elementary schools
Central School with 293 students in grades K-5
Alison Tugya, Principal
Mt. Horeb School with 202 students in grades PreK-5
Scott Cook, Principal
Angelo L. Tomaso School with 248 students in grades K-5
Christine Smith, Principal
Woodland School with 229 students in grades K-5
Jeff Heaney, Principal
Middle school
Warren Middle School with 544 students in grades 6-8
George Villar, Principal

Administration
Core members of the district's administration are:
Dr. Matthew Mingle, Superintendent
Christopher Heagele, Business Administrator / Board Secretary

Board of education
The district's board of education is comprised of nine members who set policy and oversee the fiscal and educational operation of the district through its administration. As a Type II school district, the board's trustees are elected directly by voters to serve three-year terms of office on a staggered basis, with three seats up for election each year held (since 2012) as part of the November general election. The board appoints a superintendent to oversee the district's day-to-day operations and a business administrator to supervise the business functions of the district.

References

External links
Warren Township Schools

School Data for the Warren Township Schools, National Center for Education Statistics
Watchung Hills Regional High School website

Warren Township, New Jersey
New Jersey District Factor Group I
School districts in Somerset County, New Jersey